Karl Schneider (1916 – 1996) was a German art director. He was active in East German cinema from 1949 onwards, at the state-controlled Babelsberg Studios, but later worked in the West.

Selected filmography
 The Blue Swords (1949)
 Quartet of Five (1949)
 The Benthin Family (1950)
 The Axe of Wandsbek (1951)
 The Empress of China (1953)
 Der Teufel vom Mühlenberg (1955)
 Les Misérables (1958)
 Peter Voss, Thief of Millions (1958)
 Every Day Isn't Sunday (1959)
 Hot Pavements of Cologne (1967)
 Our Doctor is the Best (1969)
 Count Dracula (1970)

References

Bibliography
 Stephen Brockmann. A Critical History of German Film. Camden House, 2010.

External links

1916 births
1996 deaths
German art directors
Film people from Berlin